Verkhnokamyanka is a village in the Sievierodonetsk Raion of Luhansk Oblast, in eastern Ukraine, near the border with Donetsk Oblast. It is about 10 km from the outskirts of Lysychansk city. Nearby settlements are Zolotarivka and Vovchoiarivka. Most of Verkhnokamyanka is occupied by the Lysychansk Oil Refinery.

The village, including the oil refinery, was captured by Russian forces during the Russo-Ukrainian War.

References 

Villages in Sievierodonetsk Raion